Pakchin (also Romanized as Pākchīn and Pākachīn; also known as Chavarchin, Pāg Chīn, Pākchīn-e ‘Olyā, Pakehchīn, and Pakeh Ḩoseyn) is a village in Mavazekhan-e Sharqi Rural District, Khvajeh District, Heris County, East Azerbaijan Province, Iran. At the 2006 census, its population was 265, in 57 families.

References 

Populated places in Heris County